The 2001 San Jose Earthquakes season was the sixth season of the team's existence, and saw the franchise win its first MLS Cup.

Squad

Current squad 
As of August 18, 2009.

Club

Management

Other information

Competitions

Major League Soccer

Matches 

(OT) = Overtime

MLS Cup Playoffs

MLS Cup

U.S. Open Cup

Source:

Standings 

Top eight teams with the highest points clinch play-off berth, regardless of division.s = Supporters Shieldx = Clinched playoff berth
Columbus Crew wins first tiebreaker with San Jose Earthquakes (1-0-1 in head-to-head competition)
GP* (Games Played) = Season shorten due to 9/11 attacks.

References

External links
San Jose Earthquakes season stats | sjearthquakes.com
San Jose Earthquakes Game Results | Soccerstats.us
San Jose Earthquakes 100 Greatest Goals 2001 | Youtube

2001
San Jose Earthquakes
San Jose Earthquakes
San Jose Earthquakes
MLS Cup champion seasons